Peperomia verticillata is a species of plant in the genus Peperomia of the family Piperaceae. It is native to the Caribbean islands.

Description
Peperomia verticillata is a small, somewhat succulent, perennial shrub growing up to 50 cm long. The leaves, growing in whorls of five along the stems, are rounded, grey-green above and red on the underside. It often grows as an epiphyte.

References

verticillata